The John McCroskey House is located at 3224 Sweetwater-Vonore Road in Sweetwater, Tennessee, United States.  It was added to the National Register of Historic Places on February 18, 2000.

References

Houses in Monroe County, Tennessee
Houses on the National Register of Historic Places in Tennessee
National Register of Historic Places in Monroe County, Tennessee